Kristen Roth (born December 10, 1985, in Ann Arbor, Michigan) is an American pair skater. skated with former partner Michael McPherson, she is the 2001 World Junior bronze medalist. They won the silver medal at the 2000-2001 Junior Grand Prix Final and competed for one season on the senior Grand Prix. After that partnership broke up following the 2003–2004 season, Roth competed with Steve Hartsell.

Results

Pairs
(with McPherson)

(with Hartsell)

N = Novice level; J = Junior level

External links
 
 Roth and McPherson Return After Year's Absence

American female pair skaters
Living people
1985 births
World Junior Figure Skating Championships medalists
21st-century American women
20th-century American women